Rashtriya Janata Dal (Democratic) (National People's Party (Democratic)), political party in India, formed when a group of five MPs (three Lok Sabha, two Rajya Sabha) broke away from Rashtriya Janata Dal 2001. RJD(D) joined National Democratic Alliance and RJD(D) leader Nagmani became a minister in the government of Atal Bihari Vajpayee 2003. Later the same year RJD(D) merged with the Bharatiya Janata Party.

References 

Defunct political parties in Bihar
Bharatiya Janata Party breakaway groups
Political parties established in 2001
2001 establishments in Bihar
Political parties disestablished in 2003
2003 disestablishments in India